New Hampshire increased its apportionment from 4 seats to 5 after the 1800 census.

See also 
 New Hampshire's at-large congressional district special election, 1802
 United States House of Representatives elections, 1802 and 1803
 List of United States representatives from New Hampshire

Notes 

1802
New Hampshire
United States House of Representatives